Joseph Harold Rose (born June 24, 1957) is a former American football tight end who played six seasons for the Miami Dolphins from 1980 to 1985 and one game for the Los Angeles Rams in 1987 in the National Football League.

Football career
Rose played high school football at Marysville, Ca., where he led Northern California in reception yardage in his senior year. Rose played college football for the University of California, Berkeley, and was the hero of the 1979 Big Game between Cal and Stanford.  He caught the game-winning touchdown pass, which was originally ruled incomplete but later changed (correctly) to a touchdown.  He was drafted in the seventh round (185th overall pick) of the 1980 NFL Draft by the Dolphins. Rose's best season in the NFL came in 1983 where he made 29 receptions for 345 yards and 3 touchdowns. His career statistics were 112 receptions, for 1493 yards with 13 touchdown receptions. Rose is best known for catching Hall of Famer Dan Marino's first ever touchdown pass in 1983.

Broadcasting career
After retiring from football, Rose became a radio broadcaster in the Miami area on 560 WQAM AM. Rose is currently the color commentator on the Dolphins radio broadcast and was sports anchor for WTVJ-TV in Miami, Florida. He lives in Davie, Florida.

External links
http://www.pro-football-reference.com/players/RoseJo00.htm
http://articles.sfgate.com/2009-11-16/sports/17180177_1_lake-tahoe-joe-rose-dolphins-uniform

1957 births
Living people
American football tight ends
American sports announcers
California Golden Bears football players
Miami Dolphins announcers
Miami Dolphins players
National Football League announcers
People from Davie, Florida
Players of American football from California
Sportspeople from Greater Sacramento
People from Marysville, California